Schott frères was a Belgian sheet music publishing house that operated between 1823 and 2006.

History
The company was founded in 1823 in Antwerp as the Belgian branch of B. Schott's Söhne (today: Schott Music). It was established by two of Bernhard Schott's four children, Johann Andreas Schott (1781–1840) and Johann Josef Schott (1782–1855). Peter Bernhard Schott (1821–1873), Johann Andreas' son, became managing director and moved it the company to Brussels around 1839.

Schott frères was one of several European music publishing firms bearing the name Schott, all of which were originally subsidiaries of B. Schott's Söhne, including locations in Paris (1826–9, 1861–92), London (from 1835), and Sydney (1885–9). Of these, only Schott frères operated independently from the German parent company from 1889 to 2006. However, they always had their own publishing programmes, operating with a large degree of commercial independence, and ensuring the distribution of works from the other locations.

Peter ("Pierre") Schott (1857–1894) inherited the publishing business of Brussels and Paris while a minor. On 5 April 1879, two granddaughters of Bernhard Schott who had been managing the Brussels and Paris houses, created the brand name "Schott frères". On 11 November 1886, the granddaughters appointed Peter Schott as sole director; On 30 September 1888, Schott frères was liquidated, with Peter Schott serving as liquidator. In 1889, he conveyed the exclusive rights of Schott frères to Otto Junne (1854–1935), a non-family managing partner. The Paris house published under the name "Éditions Schott". Jean-Jacques Junne (1924–2012), Otto's grandson, had been managing director. He was a jazz saxophonist and band leader known as Jacky June.

In 2006, Schott frères was re-acquired by Schott and absorbed into the Schott Music Group. The shop had been domiciled at Ravensteinstraat and was subsequently closed.

Time line of Schott companies

Selected plate numbers of music published by Schott frères

Influence on Belgian music
Schott frères and its Brussels predecessor, B. Schott's Söhne, played a critical role in defining a Belgian identity in music – a blend of Flemish and Belgian-French, both connected to the pure French school. Compositions were produced for chamber music, orchestras, military bands, Belgian royalty, churches, and music pedagogy, namely the Royal Conservatory of Brussels.

Selected compositions (by instrument)

Related links
 Le guide musical, classical music periodical founded in 1855 by what then was the Brussels branch of B. Schott's Söhne
 Zéphyr Records (1978–1986), classical record label of Schott frères
 Jacky June (1924–2012), Otto Junne's grandson, a Belgian jazz pioneer, who served as director of Schott frères

References
General references

Inline citations

External links
 International Music Score Library Project: Schott

Music organisations based in Belgium
Music publishing companies
Sheet music publishing companies